Wallace Joseph "Jim" Schuback (1912-1965) was an Australian rugby league footballer who played in the 1930s and 1940s.

Schuback was a tough front row forward from Bega, New South Wales who came to St. George to trial in early 1938 and was immediately signed by the club. His younger brother John Schuback also joined him to trial for the Saints, but was living out of the area, and ended up at Western Suburbs.  Shcuback played three seasons with St. George and retired at the end of the 1940 NSWRFL season due to the war. 

Schuback died on 14 October 1965 at Maroubra, New South Wales.

References

1912 births
1965 deaths
Australian rugby league players
Rugby league players from Bega, New South Wales
Rugby league props
St. George Dragons players